Spodnje Tinsko is a village in the Municipality of Šmarje pri Jelšah in eastern Slovenia. The area is part of the historical Styria region. The municipality is now included in the Savinja Statistical Region.

Churches

The settlement has two churches. They are built next to each other. The older church is dedicated to Saint Anne and dates to the 14th century. The second is a larger church dedicated to the Mother of God and was built in the second half of the 15th century. Both belong to the Zibika parish.

References

External links
Spodnje Tinsko at Geopedia

Populated places in the Municipality of Šmarje pri Jelšah